Etrurian  may refer to:

The Etrurian language, an extinct language in ancient Italy
Something derived from or related to Etrurian civilization
Etrurian architecture
Etrurian art
Etrurian cities
Etrurian coins
Etrurian history
Etrurian mythology
Etrurian numerals
Etrurian origins
Etrurian society
Etrurian terracotta warriors
Etrurian military history

See also

Etruria (disambiguation)
Etruscan (disambiguation) aka Etrurian
Tyrsenian (disambiguation) aka Etrurian
Tyrrhenian (disambiguation) aka Etrurian